Camden Road railway station was the first station by that name in Camden, North London. Opened by the Midland Railway in 1868, it was immediately to the north of the 205 yard Camden Tunnels on the Midland Main Line and the first stop from St Pancras station.

In 1870 the North London Railway opened its Camden station, then called 'Camden Town', half a mile to the south west.. This should not be confused with Camden Town Underground station which opened in 1907.  It was not until 1950 that there stopped being two 'Camden Town' stations, when the North London Railway station was renamed 'Camden Road'.

For a short period from 1878 and 1880, the MR operated the Super Outer Circle service through the station from St. Pancras to Earl's Court Underground station via tracks through Cricklewood, then using the Dudding Hill Line to South Acton and Hammersmith.

The station was closed, as were others, in 1916 as a wartime economy measure, and was not re-opened. The station buildings remained for many years before being replaced by a petrol station, and later by a car showroom.

References

External links
 Abandoned stations - Camden Road
 Sub Brit - Camden Road

Disused railway stations in the London Borough of Camden
Former Midland Railway stations
Railway stations in Great Britain opened in 1868
Railway stations in Great Britain closed in 1916
Kentish Town